Mlomp is a rural community and village in the Ziguinchor Region of Senegal in the Casamance, situated approximately  south-west of Ziguinchor.

As of 2000, it had a population of 7,628, rising to around 8,500 in 2006. Most inhabitants are of Diola ethnicity and speaking the Diola language, and many also speak the Ouolof language and French.

Administration
The rural district (communauté rurale) of Mlomp belongs to the arrondissement of Loudia Ouolof, in the Oussouye Department of the Ziguinchor Region. Within the district are the villages of :

Mlomp has an elementary and secondary school, a dispensary, and a town hall.

Geography
The localities closest to Mlomp are Djiromait, Elinkine, Kagnout, Karabane, Loudia Diola, Loudia Ouolof,  Oussouye, Pointe Saint Georges, Samatit, Bouhimban.

Demographics

According to PEPAM, (Programme d'eau potable et d'assainissement du Millénaire), the commune of Mlomp has a population of 7,628 persons living in 1,062 individual households.

Among the 24 villages of the community, three bear the name of Mlomp. These include the village of Mlomp Djibetene (480 inhabitants), Mlomp Djicomol (993 inhabitants) and Mlomp Kadjifolong (843 inhabitants), Mlomp Haer, Mlomp Etebemaye. The population is mainly Christian (80%), but it also includes animists (19%) and Muslims (1%).

The Mlomp language takes the name of the area.

Economy

Main products produced in Mlomp include rice, wines, honey, fruit and vegetables, baskets, tapestries, fish, sea food, and cheptel.

See also
 Musée de la Culture Diola

References

Bibliography
 Catherine Enel et Gilles Pison, « Sexual relations in the rural area of Mlomp (Casamance, Senegal) » in T. Dyson (sous la direction de), Sexual behaviour and networking: anthropological and socio-cultural studies on the transmission of HIV, Liège, Derouaux Ordina Editions, 1992, p. 249-267. 
 Emmanuelle Amice, Evaluation et intérêt d'un test de diagnostic rapide du paludisme à Mlomp, Sénégal,  2005   thèse
 Géraldine Duthé, La transition sanitaire en milieu rural sénégalais : évolution de la mortalité à Mlomp depuis 1985 et influence du paludisme chimiorésistant, 2006   (thèse)
 Gilles Pison, Monique Lefebvre, Catherine Enel et Jean-François Trape, L'influence des changements sanitaires sur l'évolution de la mortalité. Le cas de Mlomp (Sénégal) depuis 50 ans, Paris, INED, Dossiers et recherches n° 26, 1990, 46 p. 
 Catherine Enel, Gilles Pison et Monique Lefebvre, Migrations et évolution de la nuptialité : l'exemple d'un village Joola du Sud du Sénégal, Mlomp, Paris, INED, Dossiers et recherches n° 28, 1989, 26 p. 
 Gilles Pison, Alexis Gabadinho et Catherine Enel, Niveaux et tendances démographiques : 1985-1999 : Mlomp, Sénégal, Paris, INED, Dossiers et recherches n° 103, 2001
 Gilles Pison, Alexis Gabadinho et Catherine Enel, Mlomp : un observatoire de population et de santé au Sénégal (rapport illustré),  INED, Paris, 2002, 36 p.
 Gilles Pison, Catherine Enel, Pascal Arduin, R. Laurent et Géraldine Duthé, Population et santé à Mlomp (Sénégal) (brochure), Paris, INED, 2002, p. 1-29.
 Gilles Pison et Catherine Enel, « Le passage à l’âge adulte et la constitution de la famille. Évolutions récentes à Mlomp (Sénégal) », in Kokou Vignikin Kokou et Patrice Vimard (sous la direction de), Familles au Nord, Familles au Sud, Louvain-la-Neuve, Academia-Bruylant, 2005, p. 155-177
 Muriel Scibilia, La Casamance ouvre ses cases. Tourisme au Sénégal, L’Harmattan, 2003, 174 p. .

External links

 Maps, weather and airports for Mlomp
 Mlomp DSS, Senegal
 M'lomp sur le site du SEM
 Communauté rurale de Mlomp sur le site PEPAM
 Mlomp Dibetene sur le site PEPAM
 Mlomp Djicomol sur le site PEPAM
 Mlomp Kadjifolomg sur le site PEPAM

Populated places in the Bignona Department
Arrondissement of Tendouck
Oussouye Department